John David Emrys Beynon (born 11 March 1939) is a British academic who served as the 17th Principal of King's College London.

Biography
He was educated at the University of Wales and at the University of Southampton. From 1964-67 he was a lecturer at the University of Southampton. He was Professor of Electronics at the University of Wales Institute of Science and Technology from 1977–79, and then Head of the Department of Electronic and Electrical Engineering at the University of Surrey from 1979-83. He then became Principal of King's College London in 1990, serving until 1992, when he resigned after a breakdown of trust. He is a Fellow of the Institution of Electrical Engineers, the Royal Academy of Engineering, and of King's College London.

He is the secretary of the Bloomsbury Central Baptist Church in London, and after talking with protesters outside a Palestine Solidarity Campaign fund-raising Christmas event hosted by that church, he stated the PSC's presence there was "unreasonable"  for the church to have hosted the group owing to its associations with Hamas.

Notes

1939 births
Alumni of the University of Southampton
Academics of King's College London
Principals of King's College London
Fellows of King's College London
Academics of the University of Southampton
Academics of the University of Surrey
Fellows of the Royal Academy of Engineering
Living people